In the dystopian novel Nineteen Eighty-Four (1949), by George Orwell, Emmanuel Goldstein is the principal enemy of the state of Oceania. The political propaganda of The Party portrays Goldstein as the leader of The Brotherhood, a secret, counter-revolutionary organization who violently oppose the leadership of Big Brother and the Ingsoc régime of The Party.

Goldstein also is the author of The Theory and Practice of Oligarchical Collectivism (The Book) a treasonous counter-history of the revolution that installed The Party as the government of Oceania and which slanders Big Brother as traitor of the revolution. Throughout the story, Emmanuel Goldstein appears only in Minitrue propaganda films on a telescreen, while rumours claim that The Party wrote The Book.

The character
Emmanuel Goldstein was a member of the Inner Party and brother-in-arms of Big Brother during the revolution that installed The Party as the government of Oceania. In their turn to totalitarianism, by way of English Socialism (Ingsoc), Goldstein broke with Big Brother and The Party, and then founded The Brotherhood to oppose their government of Oceania. Party propaganda teaches that Goldstein is an enemy of the state and that The Brotherhood is a leaderless resistance of cells of secret agents waging counter-revolution against Big Brother and The Party with the ideology of The Theory and Practice of Oligarchical Collectivism, The Book written by Goldstein.

In the course of daily life in Oceania, Goldstein is always the subject of the Two Minutes Hate, a daily programme of propaganda that begins at 11:00 hours; the telescreen shows an over-sized image of Emmanuel Goldstein for the assembled citizens of Oceania to subject to loud insults and contempt. To prolong and deepen the anger of the spectators, the telescreen then shows images of Goldstein walking among the parading soldiers of the current enemy of Oceania — either Eurasia or Eastasia. The Two Minutes Hate programme shows Goldstein as both an ideological enemy of the Ingsoc régime of The Party and a traitor aiding the national enemy of Oceania.

The Party’s scapegoating of Goldstein justified the voiding of civil rights, the implementation of universal surveillance, and poverty. Save for The Party’s cultivation of a vague, but fervent, patriotism for Oceania, the Proles were excluded from the politics of Oceania, and only members of the Inner Party concerned themselves with the existence or the non-existence of Emmanuel Goldstein and The Brotherhood; thus, when the protagonist Winston Smith asks the villain O'Brien, a member of the Inner Party, if The Brotherhood exists, O'Brien replies:

In the course of a session of torture, O'Brien tells Winston that members of the Inner Party, including himself, wrote The Book, yet O'Brien's reply does not answer Winston's questions about the existence or the non-existence of Emmanuel Goldstein and The Brotherhood.

Trotsky as Goldstein
Enemies of the state
In the 1950s, soon after publication of the novel Nineteen Eighty-Four, political commentators and literary critics noted the likeness between the fictional character Emmanuel Goldstein and the Russian revolutionary Trotsky who had been a political partner of Lenin during the Russian Revolution of 1917. After the death of Lenin in 1924, despite being an Old Bolshevik, Trotsky lost the intramural party politics of succession to Stalin, who then assassinated the character of Trotsky to justify his expulsion, first from office, then from the Russian Communist Party in 1925, and then from the USSR in 1929 — public condemnation as an enemy of the people.

Exiled prophet
In foreign exile from the Communist politics of Soviet Russia, Trotsky wrote The Revolution Betrayed: What is the Soviet Union and Where is it Going?  (1937), wherein he denounced Stalin as an ideologically illegitimate leader of the Russian Communist Party and of the Soviet state whose policies and actions betrayed the principles of the Russian Revolution (1917). In the USSR, Stalin consolidated his absolute power over party and government with the Great Purges (1936–1938) by imprisoning and by killing his personal and political enemies — including every Old Bolshevik with a legitimate claim to be a candidate for leader of the Communist Party and for leader of the Soviet state.

Enemy action
Moreover, throughout the 1930s, Stalinist propaganda called for the death of Trotsky, who was depicted as the enemy of the state who instigated every problem in the Soviet Union and in the Socialist world. Stalin succeeded against his nemesis when the NKVD secret agent Ramón Mercader assassinated Trotsky in Mexico City, in 1940. Concerning the ideological differences between the varieties of Marxist philosophy that are Stalinism and Trotskyism, Orwell said:

The Book
Regarding the likeness between fictional and true-life enemies of the state, in 1954, the writer Isaac Deutscher said that Emmanuel Goldstein’s book, The Theory and Practice of Oligarchical Collectivism, was Orwell's paraphrasing of Trotsky’s The Revolution Betrayed — known as The Book in the story of Nineteen Eighty-Four. In 1956, the literary critic Irving Howe praised the writing craft of the novelist Orwell in his replication of Trotsky's style of writing for The Book by Goldstein; thus Winston Smith's readings in The Book are the best-written passages of novelistic story-telling in Nineteen Eighty-Four. The critic Adrian Wanner said that The Book is a political parody of the Marxist philosophy and analyses that Trotsky presents in The Revolution Betrayed, and noted that Orwell was politically ambivalent about Trotsky being a type of Communist different from Stalin. In correspondence with the American writer Sidney Sheldon, Orwell said that the Stalinist world portrayed in Nineteen Eighty-Four:

Contemporary comparisons

Richard M. Nixon
In the article "The Orwell Hypothesis: Nixon's Quantum Jump?" (1971), the opportunistic geopolitics of U.S. President Richard M. Nixon's official visit (21–28 February 1972) to the People's Republic of China — then a Communist enemy of the U.S. during the tripolar stage (1956–1991) of the Cold War — were compared to the historical and political analyses of Emmanuel Goldstein about the continually shifting military alliances among the three super-states, Eastasia, Oceania, and Eurasia, described in the novel Nineteen Eighty-Four (1949).

In the critical essay "Compassion for Nixon Hard to Summon" (1974), by Nick Thimmesch, and in the defensive essay "Do We Really Need Vengeance from Nixon?" (1976), by Tom Tiede, the authors discuss the mass psychology of American society's vilification of ex-president Nixon is a consequence of the criminal Watergate scandal (1972–1974), and that such political and personal vilification was a form of the Two Minutes Hate programs, which focused the collective anger of the body politic against ex-president Nixon as an enemy of the people of the United States.

Osama bin Laden
About the aftermath of the 11 September 2001 attacks against the U.S., in the essay "Osama and Goldstein" (2001), Prof. William L. Anderson said that the ideological and political utility of publicly showing parallels between Emmanuel Goldstein and Osama bin Laden facilitated and justified the U.S. government's unilateral attacks against the perceived enemies of the state and the perceived enemies of the people of the United States of America.

About the political utility of comparing Osama bin Laden, leader of al-Qaeda, to Emmanuel Goldstein, leader of The Brotherhood, in 11 September 2001: War, Terror and Judgement (2002), Bülent Gökay and R.B.J. Walker said that:

In Worst-Case Scenarios (2009), the jurist Cass Sunstein coined the term the Goldstein Effect to describe a government's "ability to intensify public concern, by giving a definite face to the adversary, specifying a human source of the underlying threat." In the case of the American Global War on Terror (2001), the government of the U.S. and the American news media respectively identified Saddam Hussein of Iraq (r. 1979–2003) and Osama bin Laden, of Saudi Arabia, as synonymous with terrorism, which parallels The Party's psychological manipulations of the population of Oceania with and during the sessions of Two Minutes' Hate featuring the sights and sounds of the wars and conspiracies of Emmanuel Goldstein and The Brotherhood against Oceania, The Party, and Big Brother.

George Soros
In "The Ironies of George Soros's Foundation Leaving Budapest" (2018), the pseudonymous author, M.S., said that in right-wing Hungarian politics, the politically progressive financier George Soros is used as a Goldstein figure, an enemy of the people of Hungary, because Soros criticised Prime Minister Viktor Orbán for poorly managing the Syrian Refugee crisis of 2015. In right-wing circles, the reactionary politics of antisemitism facilitated and justified propagating conspiracy theories about the liberal millionaire Soros seeking to impose a foreign ideology upon the Magyar people:

References

External links
 Emmanuel Goldstein: War is Peace. George Orwell: Nineteen Eighty-Four, Part II, Chapter 9.
 Emmanuel Goldstein: Ignorance is Strength. George Orwell: Nineteen Eighty-Four, Part II, Chapter 9.

Fictional characters based on real people
Fictional politicians
Fictional writers
Nineteen Eighty-Four characters
Cultural depictions of Leon Trotsky
Literary characters introduced in 1949
Fictional fugitives
Fictional revolutionaries
Male characters in literature